Arbor Hill may refer to the following places in the United States:

 Arbor Hill, Iowa in Adair County
 Arbor Hill, Albany, New York